Kosmos 70 ( meaning Cosmos 70), also known as DS-A1 No.7 was a technology demonstration satellite which was launched by the Soviet Union in 1965 as part of the Dnepropetrovsk Sputnik programme. Its primary mission was to demonstrate technologies for future Soviet military satellites. It also conducted radiation experiments.

It was launched aboard a Kosmos-2I 63S1 rocket, flying Site 86/1 at Kapustin Yar. The launch occurred at 06:28 GMT on 2 July 1965.

It decayed on 18 December 1966. Kosmos 70 was the last of seven DS-A1 satellites to be launched, of which four; Kosmos 11, Kosmos 17, Kosmos 53 and Kosmos 70, reached orbit. As with earlier DS-A1 satellites, the technological experiments aboard Kosmos 70 were tests of communications and navigation systems which were later used on the GLONASS system.

See also

 1965 in spaceflight

References

Spacecraft launched in 1965
Kosmos 0070
1965 in the Soviet Union
Dnepropetrovsk Sputnik program